Ünsal Fikirci (3 October 1939 – 10 February 1992) is a Turkish former swimmer. He competed in two events at the 1960 Summer Olympics.

References

1939 births
1992 deaths
Turkish male swimmers
Olympic swimmers of Turkey
Swimmers at the 1960 Summer Olympics
Sportspeople from Adana
20th-century Turkish people